Blocks That Matter is a 2D puzzle-platform game developed by French independent studio Swing Swing Submarine. It was released on August 19, 2011 for Windows, Mac, Linux and Xbox 360.

Gameplay

The player takes the role of "Tetrobot", a robot which is able to collect blocks by hitting them from under (Mario reference) or drilling them, and can then construct shapes in a "puzzle mode" using four blocks at a time. Blocks That Matter heavily references the games Minecraft and Tetris through the main characters, in-game mechanics and concepts such as "Pajitnovian physics". The Tetrobot will also be playable as a character in the upcoming game UFHO2.

The game's name comes from special blocks hidden in the story mode levels. They are unusable blocks that initially appear in levels as treasure chests, which serve no purpose other than to unlock bonus levels. The blocks are direct references to famous blocks in games that inspired the developers, such as a ?-block from Super Mario Bros., an Aperture Science Weighted Companion Cube from Portal, Rubik's Cube, and a die, hence the "blocks that matter".

Release
Blocks That Matter was made available as a bonus during the Voxatron Humble Indie Bundle along with The Binding of Isaac. In June 2018 the game was ported to the OpenPandora, an ARM processor-based Linux handheld.

Reception

Blocks That Matter received generally favourable reviews, with an aggregated score of 76 on Metacritic. Blocks That Matter was the Dream Build Play 2011 Challenge "Grand Prize" Winner, earning $40,000 and the opportunity for an XBLA publishing contract.

References

External links

Official website

2011 video games
Linux games
MacOS games
Puzzle-platform games
Single-player video games
Video games with Steam Workshop support
Video games developed in France
Windows games
Xbox 360 games
Xbox 360 Live Indie games